Sten & Stanley are a dansband from Karlskoga, Sweden. Established in 1962, the band has scored several Svensktoppen hits, including their signature song Jag vill vara din, Margareta. Their hit song "Dra dit pepparn växer" was translated into English and won the Castlebar Song Contest in 1985.

Discography
 Guns of Bofors 1963
 I lust och nöd 1965
 Varsågod 1966
 Sten & Stanley's australisk sångbok 1967
 Röd var din mun 1967
 Sten Nilsson 1968
 Sten Nilsson & Sten & Stanleys kör och orkester 1969
 Sten & Stanley Sten Nilsson 1970
 A Touch of Sweden 1970
 Sten Nilsson nu 1971 
 Kända låtar i stereo 1972
 Kända låtar i stereo 2 1973
 En god och glad jul 1973
 De' är dans 1974
 Sten & Stanleys bästa bitar 1975
 Bella Bella 1976
 Jambalaya 1977
 Sten Nilsson 1977
 Sten & Stanley's framsida 1977
 Copacabana 1979
 På gång 1980
 På gång 2 1982
 Adios Amor 1983
 Jag har inte tid 1984
 God jul 1984
 Musik, dans & party 1985 
 Musik, dans & party 2 1986
 En god och glad jul 1986
 Musik, dans & party 3 1987
 Musik, dans & party 4 1988
 Minnets melodi. Sten & Stanley 1963-1989 1989
 Som ett ljus. Musik, dans & party 5 1990
 Dansparty Sten & Stanley 1991
 Dansparty Sten & Stanley 1991
 Musik, dans & party 6 1991
 Musik, dans & party 7 1992
 På begäran 1989 
 Musik, dans & party 8 1993
 Musik, dans & party 9 1994
 Musik, dans & party 10 1995
 Julnatt 1995
 Musik, dans & party 11 1996
 Jag vill vara din, Margareta 1997
 San Diego. 35 år 20 hits 1997
 De tidiga åren 1998
 Bröder 1998
 Stjärnan lyser klar 2000
 Sten & Stanley framsida 2000 2000
 Du är min bästa vän 2001
 Om bara jag får 2001
 Musik, dans & party 94-96 2001
 40/40 En samling 2002
 Samlade TV-hits 2003
 Sten & Stanley önskefavoriter 2004
 Sten & Stanley då & nu 2006
 Då kommer minnerna 2011
 Sten & Stanleys 20 bästa

References

External links

Dansbands
1962 establishments in Sweden
Musical groups established in 1962
Culture in Karlskoga
Castlebar Song Contest winners